Hussein Mouftah is a Canadian computer scientist and electrical engineer, currently the Canada Research Chair and Distinguished University Professor at University of Ottawa, and also a published author.

References

Canadian computer scientists
Academic staff of the University of Ottawa
Academic staff of Queen's University at Kingston
Université Laval alumni
Alexandria University alumni
Academic staff of King Saud University
Living people
1947 births